"Didn't I" is a song recorded by American country music artist James Wesley. It was released in April 2011. The song was written by Ben Glover, Kyle Jacobs and Randy Montana.

Critical reception
Amanda Hensel of Taste of Country gave the song a favorable review, writing that "with singable lyrics and familiar feelings, country music fans will be all over it." Bobby Peacock of Roughstock gave the song four stars out of five, saying that Wesley "matches up very well to the guitar-heavy but radio-friendly production."

Music video
The music video was directed by Marcel and premiered in July 2011.

Chart performance
"Didn't I" debuted at number 58 on the U.S. Billboard Hot Country Songs chart for the week of April 30, 2011.

Year-end charts

References

2011 singles
2011 songs
BBR Music Group singles
James Wesley songs
Music videos directed by Marcel (singer)
Songs written by Ben Glover
Songs written by Kyle Jacobs (songwriter)
Songs written by Randy Montana